The following is a list of works about the spouses of presidents of the United States. While this list is mainly about presidential spouses, administrations with a bachelor or widowed president have a section on the individual (usually a family member) that filled the role of First Lady. The list includes books and journal articles written in English after c. 1900 as well as primary sources written by the individual themselves.

The books included here were selected because they were either published by an academic press or major nationally known publisher or were reviewed in mainstream academic journals. These works are generally intended for an adult audience; works specifically intended for a youth or children are not included.

Several presidents were unmarried for all or part of their administration. 
 Thomas Jefferson, Andrew Jackson, Chester A. Arthur, and Martin Van Buren were widowed prior to becoming president and remained unmarried during their administration; in these cases, family members acted in the place of First Lady and White House host.
 John Tyler, Benjamin Harrison, and Woodrow Wilson's wives died while they were in office. Tyler and Wilson both quickly remarried during their presidency. 
 James Buchanan was a life long bachelor and never married.
 Grover Cleveland entered the White House as a bachelor, but married while in office. 
Because this list also serves as a bibliography of first ladies, in these cases, when someone regularly filled the role of White House hostess and informal first lady while the president was unmarried, an entry is provided.

General works
Books
 Abrams, J. E. (2018). First Ladies of the Republic: Martha Washington, Abigail Adams, Dolley Madison, and the Creation of an Iconic American Role. New York: NYU Press.
 Anthony, C. S. (1991). First Ladies: The Saga of the Presidents' Wives and Their Power (2 vols.). New York: William Morrow and Co.
 Beasley, M. H. (2005). First ladies and the Press: The Unfinished Partnership for the Media Age. Evanston, IL: Northwestern University Press.
 Black, A. M. (2019). The First Ladies of the United States of America. Washington D.C.: White House Historical Association.
 Brower, K. A. (2015). The Residence: Inside the Private World of The White House. New York: HarperCollins.
 ——. (2017). First Women: The Grace and Power of America's Modern First Ladies. New York: HarperCollins.
 Burns, L. M. (2008). First Ladies and the Fourth Estate: Press Framing of Presidential Wives. DeKalb, IL: Northern Illinois University Press.
 Caroli, B. (2010). First Ladies: From Martha Washington to Michelle Obama. New York: Oxford University Press.
 Gullan, H. I. (2001). Faith of our Mothers: The Stories of Presidential Mothers from Mary Washington to Barbara Bush. Grand Rapids: William B. Eerdmans.
 Hendricks, N. (2015). America's First Ladies: A Historical Encyclopedia and Primary Document Collection. Santa Barbara, CA: ABC-CLIO.
 Marton, K. (2001). Hidden Power: Presidential Marriages That Shaped Our History. New York: Pantheon.
 Schwartz, M. J. (2017). Ties That Bound: Founding First Ladies and Slaves. Chicago: University of Chicago Press.
 Sibley, K. A. S. (2016). A Companion to First Ladies, (Wiley Blackwell Companions to American History). Chichester, MA: Wiley Blackwell.
 Swain, S. (2016). First Ladies: Presidential Historians on the Lives of 45 Iconic American Women. New York: PublicAffairs.
 Truman, M. (1999). First Ladies. New York: Random House.
 Watson, R. P. (2004). Life in the White House: A Social History of the First Family and the President's House. Albany, NY: State University of New York Press. 
 Wead, D. (2004). All The Presidents' Children: Triumph And Tragedy In The Lives Of America's First Families. New York, NY: Simon and Schuster.

Journal articles
 Black, A. (2001). The Modern First Lady and Public Policy: From Edith Wilson through Hillary Rodham Clinton. OAH Magazine of History, 15(3), pp. 15–20.
 O'Connor, K., Nye, B., & Van Assendelft, L. (1996). Wives in the White House: The Political Influence of First Ladies. Presidential Studies Quarterly, 26(3), pp. 835–853. 
 Parry-Giles, S., & Blair, D. (2002). The Rise of the Rhetorical First Lady: Politics, Gender Ideology, and Women's Voice, 1789-2002. Rhetoric and Public Affairs, 5(4), pp. 565-599.
 Sheeler, K. H. (2013). Remembering the Rhetorical First Lady. Rhetoric and Public Affairs, 16(4), pp. 767–782.
 Watson, R. (1997). The First Lady Reconsidered: Presidential Partner and Political Institution. Presidential Studies Quarterly, 27(4), pp. 805–818.
 Watson, R. (2001). The "White Glove Pulpit": A History of Policy Influence by First Ladies. OAH Magazine of History, 15(3), pp. 9–14. 
 Watson, R. (2003). "Source Material": Toward the Study of the First Lady: The State of Scholarship. Presidential Studies Quarterly, 33(2), pp. 423–441.

Specific works

Martha Washington
Martha Washington, née Dandridge; (born June 2, 1731  died May 22, 1802); (in position April 30, 1789  March 4, 1797); The wife of George Washington.

Books
 Berkin, C. (2009). Revolutionary Mothers: Women in the Struggle for America's Independence. New York: Vintage Books.
 Brady, P. (2014). Martha Washington: An American Life. New York: Penguin Books.
 Bryan, H. (2002). Martha Washington: First Lady of Liberty. New York: Wiley.
 Chadwick, B. (2007). The General & Mrs. Washington: The Untold Story of a Marriage and a Revolution. Naperville, Ill: Sourcebooks.
 Fraser, F. (2015). The Washingtons: George and Martha. "Join'd by Friendship, Crown'd by Love". New York: Knopf.
 Norton, M. B. (1980). Liberty's Daughters: The Revolutionary Experience of American Women, 17501800. Glenview: Scott, Foresman & Co.

Biographies of George Washington with significant information about Martha Washington
 Chernow, R. (2010). Washington: A life. New York: Penguin Press.
 Flexner, J. T. (1965). George Washington (4 vols.). Boston: Little, Brown and Company.

Journal articles
 Watson, R. (2000). Remembering Martha. OAH Magazine of History, 14(2), pp. 54–56.

Primary sources
 Fields, J. E. (1994). Worthy Partner: The Papers of Martha Washington. Westport, CT: Greenwood Press.
 Martha Washington letters. Collaborative project of George Washington's Mount Vernon and the Center for History and New Media.
 Washington, G. (1997). George Washington: Writings (Library of America Founders Collection) (J. H. Rhodehamel, Ed.).. New York: Penguin Random House.

Abigail Adams
Abigail Adams, née Smith; (born November 22, 1744  died October 28, 1818); (in position March 4, 1797  March 4, 1801); The wife of John Adams. The mother of John Quincy Adams and grandmother of Charles Francis Adams Sr.

Books
 Akers, C. W. (2007). Abigail Adams: A Revolutionary American Woman (3rd edition). New York: Pearson Longman.
 Barker-Benfield, G.J. (2010). Abigail and John Adams: The Americanization of Sensibility. Chicago, IL: University of Chicago Press.
 Ellis, Joseph J. (2010). First Family: Abigail and John Adams. New York: Alfred A. Knopf.
 Gelles, E. B. (2009). Abigail and John: Portrait of a Marriage. New York: William Morrow.
 ——. (2010). Portia: The World of Abigail Adams. Bloomington, IN: Indiana University Press.
 ——. (2017). Abigail Adams: A Writing Life. New York: Routledge.
 Gullan, H. I. (2001). Faith of our Mothers: The Stories of Presidential Mothers from Mary Washington to Barbara Bush. Grand Rapids: William B. Eerdmans.
 Holton, W. (2009). Abigail Adams: A Life. New York: Free Press.
 Kaminski, J. P. (Ed.). (2009). The Quotable Abigail Adams. Cambridge, MA: Belknap Press.
 Keller, R. S. (1994). Patriotism and the Female Sex: Abigail Adams and the American Revolution. Brooklyn, N.Y: Carlson.
 Levin, P. L. (2001). Abigail Adams: A Biography. New York: St. Martin's Press.
 Nagel, P. C. (1987). The Adams Women: Abigail and Louisa Adams, Their Sisters and Daughters. New York: Oxford University Press.
 Norton, M. B. (1980). Liberty's Daughters: The Revolutionary Experience of American Women, 17501800. Glenview: Scott, Foresman & Co.
 Whitney, J. (2013). Abigail Adams. London: Harrap.
 Withey, L. (1981). Dearest Friend: A Life of Abigail Adams. New York: Atria Simon & Schuster.

Biographies of John Adams with significant information about Abigal Adams
 McCullough, D. G. (2001). John Adams. New York: Simon & Schuster.

Journal articles
 Crane, E. (1999). Political Dialogue and the Spring of Abigail's Discontent. The William and Mary Quarterly, 56(4), pp. 745–774.
 Crane, E. (2007). Abigail Adams, Gender Politics, and "The History of Emily Montague". The William and Mary Quarterly, 64(4), third series, pp. 839–844.
 Damiano, S. T. (2017). Writing Women's History Through the Revolution: Family Finances, Letter Writing, and Conceptions of Marriage. The William and Mary Quarterly, 74(4), pp. 697–728.
 Forbes, A. (1936). Abigail Adams, Commentator. Proceedings of the Massachusetts Historical Society, 66, pp. 126–153.
 Gelles, E. B. (1979). Abigail Adams: Domesticity and the American Revolution. The New England Quarterly, 52(4), pp. 500–521.
 Gelles, E. B (1987). A Virtuous Affair: The Correspondence Between Abigail Adams and James Lovell. American Quarterly, 39(2), pp. 252–269.
 Gelles, E. B. (1988). The Abigail Industry. The William and Mary Quarterly, 45(4), pp. 656–683.
 Gelles, E. B. (1996). Bonds of Friendship: The Correspondence of Abigail Adams and Mercy Otis Warren. Proceedings of the Massachusetts Historical Society, 108, pp. 35–71.
 Gelles, E. B. (2006). The Adamses Retire. Early American Studies 4(1), pp. 1–15.
 Holton, W. (2007). Abigail Adams, Bond Speculator. The William and Mary Quarterly, 64(4), third series, pp. 821–838.
 Hutson, J. (1975). Women in the Era of the American Revolution: The Historian as Suffragist. The Quarterly Journal of the Library of Congress, 32(4), pp. 290–303.
 McCullough, D. (2001). Abigail in Paris. Massachusetts Historical Review, 3, pp. 1–18.
 Musto, D. (1981). The Adams Family. Proceedings of the Massachusetts Historical Society, 93, pp. 40–58.
 Ryerson, R. (1988). The Limits of a Vicarious Life: Abigail Adams and Her Daughter. Proceedings of the Massachusetts Historical Society, 100, pp. 1–14.
 Shields, D. S., & Fredrika J. T. (2015). The Court of Abigail Adams. Journal of the Early Republic 35(2), pp. 227–235.

Primary sources
 * Adams, J. (1997). John Adams: Writings (2 vols.) (Library of America Founders Collection) (G. S. Wood, Ed.). New York: Penguin Random House.
 Adams, J., Cappon, L. J. (2012). The Adams-Jefferson Letters: The Complete Correspondence Between Thomas Jefferson and Abigail and John Adams. Chapel Hill: The University of North Carolina Press.
 Adams, J., Adams, A., & Shuffelton, F. (Ed.). (2004). The letters of John and Abigail Adams. New York: Penguin Books.
 The Adams Family Papers. The Massachusetts Historical Society.

Martha Wayles Skelton Jefferson
Martha Jefferson, née Wayles; (born October 19 or 30, 1748  died September 6, 1782); (in position: never); The wife of Thomas Jefferson. Martha Jefferson died before her husband assumed the presidency, so she never served as first lady. Since she died young (age 33) comparatively little is written about her independent of biographies of Thomas Jefferson. Her daughter Martha served as informal first lady (see below).

Books
 Holowchak, M. (2018). Jefferson and Women. Charlottesville, VA: Thomas Jefferson Heritage Society. 
 Hyland, W. G. (2014). Martha Jefferson: An intimate life with Thomas Jefferson. Lanham, MD: Rowman Littlefield. 
 Kukla, J. (2008). Mr. Jefferson's Women. New York: Vintage Books.
 Malone, D. (1993). Jefferson the Virginian. Boston: Little, Brown and Company. (Original work published 1948).
William G. Hyland (1993). Jr. Martha Jefferson: An Intimate Life with Thomas Jefferson
Fiction books

 Kelly Joyce Neff. (1997) Dear Companion: The Inner Life of Martha Jefferson

Other
 Watson, R. P., & Yon, R. M. (2002). The Unknown Presidential Wife: Martha Wayles Skelton Jefferson. Ripton, VT: Jefferson Legacy Foundation.

Martha Jefferson Randolph
Martha Jefferson Randolph, née Jefferson; (born September 27, 1772  died October 10, 1836); (in role: March 4, 1801  March 4, 1809); She was the eldest daughter of Thomas Jefferson and his wife Martha Wayles Skelton Jefferson. By the time Jefferson was President, she was his only surviving child with his wife. Since Jefferson never remarried, she served as needed in her mother's place as White House hostess and informal first lady during Jefferson's administration.

Books
 Kierner, C. A. (2012). Martha Jefferson Randolph, Daughter of Monticello: Her Life and Times. Chapel Hill, NC: University of North Carolina Press.
 Wead, D. (2004). All The Presidents' Children: Triumph And Tragedy In The Lives Of America's First Families. New York, NY: Simon and Schuster.
 Sibley, K. A. S. (2016). A Companion to First Ladies, (Wiley Blackwell Companions to American History). Chichester, MA: Wiley Blackwell.

Journal articles
 Kerrison, C. (2013). The French Education of Martha Jefferson Randolph. Early American Studies, 11(2), pp. 349–394.

Dolley Madison
Dolley Madison, née Payne; (born May 20, 1768  died July 12, 1849; (in position: March 4, 1809 – March 4, 1817); The wife of James Madison. There is a variety of ways her first name is spelled; depending on the era of writing a different form of her first name may be used. Dollie, appears to have been her given name at birth. Her birth was registered with the New Garden Friends Meeting as Dolley and her will of 1841 uses Dolly.

Books
 Allgor, C. (2000). Parlor Politics: In Which the Ladies of Washington Help Build a City and a Government. Charlottesville: University Press of Virginia.
 Allgor, C. (2006). A Perfect Union: Dolley Madison and the Creation of the American Nation. New York: Henry Holt & Co.
 Allgor, C. (2012). Dolley Madison: The Problem of National Unity. Boulder, CO: Westview Press.
 Côté, R. N. (2005). Strength and Honor: The Life of Dolley Madison. Mt. Pleasant, SC: Corinthian Books.
 Howard, H. (2012). Mr. and Mrs. Madison's War: America's First Couple and the Second War of Independence. New York: Bloomsbury.

Journal articles
 Allgor, C. (2000). "Queen Dolley" Saves Washington City. Washington History, 12(1), pp. 54–69.
 Scofield, M. E. (2012). Yea or Nay to Removing the Seat of Government: Dolley Madison and the Realities of 1814 Politics. The Historian, 74(3), pp. 449–466.
 Schulman, H. (2010). "A Constant Attention": Dolley Madison and the Publication of the Papers of James Madison, 1836-1837. The Virginia Magazine of History and Biography, 118(1), pp. 40–70.
 Schulman, H. (2011). Madison v. Madison: Dolley Payne Madison and Her Inheritance of the Montpelier Estate, 1836-38. The Virginia Magazine of History and Biography, 119(4), pp. 350–393.
 Todd, J., Todd, D., Madison, J., & Sifton, P. (1963). "What a Dread Prospect...": Dolley Madison's Plague Year. The Pennsylvania Magazine of History and Biography, 87(2), pp. 182–188.

Primary sources
 Cutts, L. B. (1970). Memoirs and Letters of Dolly Madison. Boston: Houghton Mifflin.
 Madison, J. (1995). James Madison: Writings (Library of America Founders Collection) (J. N. Rakvoe, Ed.).. New York: Penguin Random House.
 Mattern, D. B., & Shulman, H. C. (2003). The Selected Letters of Dolley Payne Madison. Charlottesville: University of Virginia Press.

Biographies of James Madison with significant information about Dolley Madison
 Brookhiser, R. (2013). James Madison. New York: Basic Books.

Elizabeth Monroe
Elizabeth Jane Monroe, née Kortright; (born June 30, 1768  died September 23, 1830); (in position: March 4, 1817 – March 4, 1825); The wife of James Monroe.

Books
 Ammon, H. (2008). James Monroe: The Quest for National Identity. Newtown, CT: American Political Biography Press.
 McGrath, T. (2020). James Monroe: A Life. New York: Penguin Random House.

Louisa Adams
Louisa Adams, née Johnson; (born February 12, 1775  died May 15, 1852); (in position March 4, 1825  March 4, 1829); The wife of John Quincy Adams. The mother of Charles Francis Adams (18071886). The first First Lady to be born outside of the United States or the American colonies.

Books
 Nagel, P. (1987). The Adams Women: Abigail and Louisa Adams, Their Sisters and Daughters Cambridge, MA: Harvard University Press.
 O'Brien, M. (2010). Mrs. Adams in Winter: A Journey in the Last Days of Napoleon. New York: Farrar, Straus and Giroux.
 Thomas, L. (2016). Louisa: The Extraordinary Life of Mrs. Adams. New York: Penguin Press.

Journal articles
 Allgor, C. (1997). "A Republican in a Monarchy": Louisa Catherine Adams in Russia. Diplomatic History, 21(1), pp. 15–43. 
 Butterfield, L. (1974). Tending a Dragon-Killer: Notes for the Biographer of Mrs. John Quincy Adams. Proceedings of the American Philosophical Society, 118(2), pp. 165–178.

Primary sources
 Adams, J. Q. (2017). John Quincy Adams: Writings (2 vols.) (Library of America Founders Collection) (D. Waldstreicher, Ed.).. New York: Penguin Random House.
 Adams, L. C., et al. (2013). The Adams Papers. Diary and Autobiographical Writings of Louisa Catherine Adams. Cambridge, MA: Belknap Press.
 Hogan, M. A., Lane, L. (2014). A Traveled First Lady: Writings of Louisa Catherine Adams. Cambridge, MA: Belknap Press. .

Biographies of John Quincy Adams with significant information about Louisa Adams
 Nagel, P. C. (2012). John Quincy Adams: A Public Life, A Private Life. New York: Knopf.

Rachel Jackson
Rachel Jackson, née Donelson; June 15, 1767  December 22, 1828; The wife of Andrew Jackson. The aunt of Emily Donelson (18071836). Rachel Jackson died just after Jackson's election but before his inauguration as President; she never served as First Lady. The role was assumed by her niece, Emily Donelson until 1834 and from then by Sarah Yorke Jackson, Jackson's daughter-in-law. She was the final first lady to be born before the Declaration of Independence.

Biographies of Andrew Jackson with significant content on Rachel Jackson
 Brands, H. W. (2005). Andrew Jackson: His Life and Times. New York: Knopf.
 Cheathem, M. R. (2007). Old Hickory's Nephew: The political and private struggles of Andrew Jackson Donelson. Baton Rouge, LA: Louisiana State University Press. .
 Remini, R. V. (1977/1981). Andrew Jackson and the Course of American Empire (Vols. 12). New York: Harper & Row.
 Sibley, K. A. S. (2016). A Companion to First Ladies, (Wiley Blackwell Companions to American History). Chichester, MA: Wiley Blackwell.
 Spence, R. D. (2017). Andrew Jackson Donelson: Jacksonian and Unionist. Nashville: Vanderbilt University Press. .

Emily Donelson
Emily Donelson, née none; (born June 1, 1807  died December 19, 1836); (in position March 4, 1829  November 26, 1834); The niece of Andrew Jackson. She served as acting First Lady and White House host in the place of her mother, Rachel Jackson.

Books
 Burke, P. W. (1941). Emily Donelson of Tennessee (2 vols.). Richmond, VA: Garrett and Massie.
 Sibley, K. A. S. (2016). A Companion to First Ladies, (Wiley Blackwell Companions to American History). Chichester, MA: Wiley Blackwell.
 Wead, D. (2004). All The Presidents' Children: Triumph And Tragedy In The Lives Of America's First Families. New York, NY: Simon and Schuster.

Sarah Yorke Jackson
Sarah Jackson, née Yorke; (born July 16, 1803  died August 23, 1887); (in position November 26, 1834  March 4, 1837); The daughter-in-law of Andrew Jackson; she served as White House hostess and acting First Lady in the place of her mother in law.

Relatively little has been written about Sarah York Jackson. For information about her, see the Bibliography of Andrew Jackson.

Hannah Van Buren
Hannah Van Buren, née Hoes; (born March 8, 1783   died February 5, 1819); The wife of Martin Van Buren. She died before Van Buren was elected President, so never held the position of First Lady. Acting as First Lady and White House host in her place was her daughter in law, Sarah Van Buren. Because she died at age 35 before Martin Van Buren became widely known, very little is known about her.

Books
 Black, A. M. (2019). The First Ladies of the United States of America. Washington D.C.: White House Historical Association.
 Sibley, K. A. S. (2016). A Companion to First Ladies, (Wiley Blackwell Companions to American History). Chichester, MA: Wiley Blackwell.

Primary sources 
 The Papers of Martin Van Buren at Cumberland University

Relatively little has been written about Hannah Van Buren. For information about her, see the Bibliography of Martin Van Buren.

Sarah Van Buren
Sarah Angelica Van Buren, née Singleton; February 13, 1818  December 29, 1877; The daughter in law of Martin Van Buren. She was married to the President's son, Abraham Van Buren and served as acting First Lady and White House host in the place of her mother in law, Hannah Van Buren.

Books
  Sibley, K. A. S. (2016). A Companion to First Ladies, (Wiley Blackwell Companions to American History). Chichester, MA: Wiley Blackwell.
 Wead, D. (2004). All The Presidents' Children: Triumph And Tragedy In The Lives Of America's First Families. New York, NY: Simon and Schuster.

Primary sources
 Angelica Singleton Van Buren Collection at University of South Carolina

Relatively little has been written about Sarah Van Buren. For information about her, see the Bibliography of Martin Van Buren.

Anna Harrison
Anna Tuthill Harrison, née Symmes; July 25, 1775  February 25, 1864; The wife of William Henry Harrison and grandmother of Benjamin Harrison. Since Harrison died less than a month into his term in office, she is the individual who spent the shortest time as First Lady. She was too ill to travel from Ohio to Washington D.C. when her husband became President, so Jane Irwin Harrison, Harrison's daughter in law served as White House hostess during his short time in office.

Relatively little has been written about Anna Harrison. For information about her, see the Bibliography of William Henry Harrison

Letitia Tyler
Letitia Christian Tyler, née Christian; November 12, 1790  September 10, 1842; The wife of John Tyler. When John Tyler became the first vice president to ascend to the presidency, Letitia Tyler became First Lady. She was the first of three people to die while in the position.

Journal articles
 Leahy, C. (2006). Torn between Family and Politics: John Tyler's Struggle for Balance. The Virginia Magazine of History and Biography, 114(3), pp. 322–355.

Relatively little has been written about Letitia Tyler. For information about her, see the Bibliography of John Tyler

Priscilla Tyler
Priscilla Cooper Tyler, née Cooper; June 14, 1816  December 29, 1889; The daughter in law of John Tyler. She was married to the President's son, Robert Tyler and served as acting First Lady and White House host after the death of her mother in law, Letitia Tyler, from September, 1842  March, 1844.

Journal articles
 Leahy, C. (2012). Playing Her Greatest Role: Priscilla Cooper Tyler and the Politics of the White House Social Scene, 1841–44. The Virginia Magazine of History and Biography, 120(3), pp. 236–269.

Relatively little has been written about Priscilla Tyler. For information about her, see the Bibliography of John Tyler.

Letitia Semple
Letitia "Letty" Christian Semple, née Tyler; May 11, 1821  December 28, 1907; The daughter of John Tyler. She served as acting First Lady and White House host from March, 1844  June 26, 1844, after her sister in law, Priscilla Tyler left the White House. She was succeeded in the position by Tyler's second wife Julia.

Relatively little has been written about Letitia Semple. For information about her, see the Bibliography of John Tyler.

Julia Tyler
Julia Gardiner Tyler, née Gardiner; May 4, 1820  July 10, 1889; The daughter in law of Martin Van Buren. She was the second wife of John Tyler. She served the second shortest period of time as First Lady after Anna Harrison, from June 26, 1844 to March 4, 1845.

Journal articles
 Pugh, E. (1980). Women and Slavery: Julia Gardiner Tyler and the Duchess of Sutherland. The Virginia Magazine of History and Biography, 88(2), pp. 186–202.

Relatively little has been written about Julia Tyler. For information about her, see the Bibliography of John Tyler.

Sarah Polk 
Sarah Polk, née Childress; September 4, 1803  August 14, 1891; She was the wife of James Polk.

Books
 Bumgarner, J. R. (1997). Sarah Childress Polk: A Biography of the Remarkable First Lady. Jefferson, NC: McFarland. 
 Claxton, J. (1972). 88 years with Sarah Polk. New York, NY: Vantage Press. .
 Greenberg, A. S. (2019). Lady First: The World of First Lady Sarah Polk. New York: Alfred A. Knopf.

Journal articles
 Bergeron, P. (1987). All in the Family: President Polk in the White House. Tennessee Historical Quarterly, 46(1), pp. 10–20.
 Thweatt, J. (1974). The James K. Polk Papers. Tennessee Historical Quarterly, 33(1), pp. 93–98.
 Wallace, S. (1952). Letters of Mrs. James K. Polk to her Husband. Tennessee Historical Quarterly
 Part One: 11(2), pp. 180-191. 
 Part Two: 11(3), pp. 282-288.

Primary sources
 Digital Collection: James K. Polk Papers. Washington D.C.: The Library of Congress.
 Correspondence Of James K. Polk. Knoxville, TN: The University of Tennessee.

Biographies of James Polk with significant information about Sarah Polk
 Borneman, W. R. (2008). Polk. New York: Random House.

Margaret Taylor 
Margaret "Peggy" Mackall Taylor, née Smith; September 21, 1788   August 14, 1852; She was the wife of Zachary Taylor.

Relatively little has been written about Margaret Taylor. For information about her, see the Bibliography of Zachary Taylor.

Abigail Fillmore 
Abigail Fillmore, née Powers; March 13, 1798  March 30, 1853; She was the wife of Millard Fillmore. She was the final first lady to be born in the eighteenth century.

Biographies of Millard Fillmore with significant information on Abigail Fillmore
 Rayback, Robert J. (2015). Millard Fillmore: Biography of a President. Newtown, CT: American Political Biography Press.
 Scarry, R. J. (2001). Millard Fillmore. Jefferson, NC: McFarland & Co.

Relatively little has been written about Abigail Fillmore. For information about her, see the Bibliography of Millard Fillmore.

Jane Pierce 
Jane Means Pierce, née Appleton; March 12, 1806  December 2, 1863; She was the wife of Franklin Pierce.

Relatively little has been written about Jane Pierce. For information about her, see the Bibliography of Franklin Pierce.

Harriet Lane 
Harriet Rebecca Lane Johnston, née Lane; May 9, 1830  July 3, 1903; She was the niece of James Buchanan. Buchanan was never married and Harriet Lane acted as First Lady during his presidency.

Relatively little has been written about Harriet Lane. For information about her, see the Bibliography of James Buchanan.

Mary Todd Lincoln 
Mary Todd Lincoln, née Todd; December 13, 1818  July 16, 1882; She was the wife of Abraham Lincoln.

Books
 Baker, J. H. (1987). Mary Todd Lincoln: A Biography. New York: W.W. Norton & Company.
 Clinton, C. (2010). Mrs. Lincoln: A Life. New York Harper Perennial.
 Ellison, B. B. (2014). The True Mary Todd Lincoln: A Biography. Jefferson, NC: McFarland & Company.
 Emerson, J., & Brust, J. S. (2014). The Madness of Mary Lincoln. Carbondale, IL: Southern Illinois University Press.
 McDermott, S. P. (2015). Mary Lincoln: Southern Girl, Northern Woman. New York: Routledge.
 Neely, M. E., & McMurtry, R. G. (2014). The Insanity File: The Case of Mary Todd Lincoln. Carbondale, IL: Southern Illinois University Press.
 Randall, R. P. (1953). Mary Lincoln: Biography of a Marriage. Boston: Little, Brown and Co.
 Simmons, D. L. (1970). A Rose for Mrs. Lincoln: A Biography of Mary Todd Lincoln. Boston: Beacon.
 Williams, F. J. (2012). The Mary Lincoln Enigma: Historians on America's most controversial First Lady. Carbondale: Southern Illinois University Press.

Journal articles
 Bach, J. (2004). Acts of Remembrance: Mary Todd Lincoln and Her Husband's Memory. Journal of the Abraham Lincoln Association, 25(2), pp. 25–49.
 Baker, J. (1988). Mary Todd Lincoln: Biography as Social History. The Register of the Kentucky Historical Society, 86(3), pp. 203–215.
 Baker, J. (1990). Mary Todd Lincoln: Managing Home, Husband, and Children. Journal of the Abraham Lincoln Association, 11, pp. 1–12.
 Emerson, J. (2010). Mary Lincoln: An Annotated Bibliography. Journal of the Illinois State Historical Society, 103(2), pp. 180–235.
 Emerson, J. (2011). Mary Lincoln: An Annotated Bibliography Supplement. Journal of the Illinois State Historical Society, 104(3), pp. 238–249. 
 Holden, C.J. (2004). Review of the book Abraham and Mary Lincoln: A House Divided. Film & History: An Interdisciplinary Journal of Film and Television Studies 34(1), pp. 76–77.
 Neely, M. (1996). The Secret Treason of Abraham Lincoln's Brother-in-Law. Journal of the Abraham Lincoln Association, 17(1), pp. 39–43. 
 Scharf, L., & Neely, M. (1988).A House Divided: Mary Todd Lincoln and Her Family. Reviews in American History, 16(2), pp. 227–232.
 Schwartz, T. (2005). Mary Todd's 1835 Visit to Springfield, Illinois. Journal of the Abraham Lincoln Association, 26(1), pp. 42–45.

Primary sources
 Papers of Abraham Lincoln Digital Library. Abraham Lincoln Presidential Library
 Abraham Lincoln Papers at the Library of Congress. Library of Congress Digital Collection
 Robert Todd Lincoln family papers. Library of Congress.
 Manuscripts for: Mary Lincoln. First Ladies National Library.

Biographies of Abraham Lincoln with significant content on Mary Todd Lincoln
 Burlingame, M. (2013). Abraham Lincoln: A Life (2 vols.). Baltimore: The Johns Hopkins University Press
 Donald, D. H. (1995). Lincoln. New York: Simon & Schuster.
 McPherson, J. M. (2009). Abraham Lincoln. Oxford: Oxford University Press.

Eliza Johnson 
Eliza McCardle Johnson, née McCardle; October 4, 1810  January 15, 1876; She was the wife of Andrew Johnson.

Primary sources
 The papers of Andrew Johnson. Digital Collection, The United States National Archives.
 The papers of Andrew Johnson. Digital Collection, The Library of Congress.

Relatively little has been written about Eliza Johnson. For information about her, see the Bibliography of Andrew Johnson.

Julia Grant 
Julia Boggs Grant, née Dent; January 26, 1826  December 14, 1902; She was the wife of Ulysses S. Grant.

Primary sources
 The Personal Memoirs of Ulysses S. Grant
 The papers of Ulysses S. Grant. Mississippi State University.
 The papers of Ulysses S. Grant. Digital Collection, The Library of Congress.
 The papers of Ulysses S. Grant. Digital Collection, The United States National Archives.
 Simon, J. Y., & Catton, B. (1996). The Personal Memoirs of Julia Dent Grant. Carbondale: Southern Illinois University Press.

Biographies of Ulysses S. Grant with significant information about Julia Grant
 Chernow, R. (2017). Grant. New York: Penguin Press.

Relatively little has been written about Julia Grant. For information about her, see the Bibliography of Ulysses S. Grant.

Lucy Hayes 
Lucy Webb Hayes, née Webb; August 28, 1831  June 25, 1889; She was the wife of Rutherford B. Hayes.

Primary sources
 The papers of Rutherford B. Hayes. The Rutherford B. Hayes Library.

Relatively little has been written about Lucy Hayes. For information about her, see the Bibliography of Rutherford B. Hayes.

Lucretia Garfield 
Lucretia Garfield, née Rudolph; April 19, 1832  March 13, 1918; She was the wife of James A. Garfield.

Primary sources
 The papers of James A. Garfield. The Library of Congress.

Relatively little has been written about Lucretia Garfield. For information about her, see the Bibliography of James A. Garfield.

Nell Arthur
Nell Arthur, née Herndon; August 30, 1837  January 12, 1880; She was the wife of Chester A. Arthur, but died two years before he became President, so never assumed the position.

Primary sources
 The papers of Chester Alan Arthur. The Library of Congress.

Relatively little has been written about Nell Arthur. For information about her, see the Bibliography of Chester A. Arthur.

Mary Arthur McElroy
Mary Arthur McElroy, née Arthur; July 5, 1841 January 8, 1917; She was the sister of Chester A. Arthur; she assumed the role of acting First Lady in the place of Arthur's deceased wife.

Primary sources
 The papers of Chester Alan Arthur. The Library of Congress.

Relatively little has been written about Mary Arthur McElroy. For information about her, see the Bibliography of Chester A. Arthur.

Frances Cleveland 
Frances Clara Cleveland Preston, née Folsom; date  date; She was the wife of Grover Cleveland. She was the youngest person (age 21) to fill the position of First Lady and is one of two who remarried after the deaths of their Presidential husbands and one of two First Ladies to marry a sitting President.

Primary sources
 The papers of Grover Cleveland. The Library of Congress.

Relatively little has been written about Frances Cleveland. For information about her, see the Bibliography of Grover Cleveland.

Rose Cleveland
Rose Elizabeth Cleveland, née Name; date  date; She was the sister of Grover Cleveland. Since Cleveland entered the White House unmarried, Rose Cleveland served as acting First Lady and White House host until her brother married fourteen months into his first term. She is the only LGBTQ individual to serve in the position of First Lady and White House hostess.

Primary sources
 The papers of Grover Cleveland. The Library of Congress.

Relatively little has been written about Rose Cleveland. For information about her, see the Bibliography of Grover Cleveland.

Caroline Harrison 
Caroline Lavinia Harrison, née Scott; October 1, 1832   October 25, 1892; She was the wife of Benjamin Harrison.

Primary sources
 The papers of Benjamin Harrison. The Library of Congress.

Relatively little has been written about Caroline Harrison. For information about her, see the Bibliography of Benjamin Harrison.

Mary Harrison McKee
Mary Harrison McKee, née Harrison; April 3, 1858  October 28, 1930; She was the daughter of Benjamin Harrison. She assumed the role of acting First Lady after the death of her mother.

Primary sources
 The papers of Benjamin Harrison. The Library of Congress.

Relatively little has been written about Mary Harrison McKee. For information about her, see the Bibliography of Benjamin Harrison.

Ida McKinley 
Ida Saxton McKinley, née Saxton; June 8, 1847  May 26, 1907; She was the wife of William McKinley.

Books
 Anthony, C. S. (2013). Ida McKinley: The Turn-of-the-Century First Lady through War, Assassination, and Secret Disability. Kent, OH: The Kent State University Press.

Primary sources
 The papers of William McKinley. The Library of Congress.

Relatively little has been written about Ida McKinley. For information about her, see the Bibliography of William McKinley.

Edith Roosevelt 
Edith Kermit Roosevelt, née Carrow; August 6, 1861   September 30, 1948; She was the wife of Theodore Roosevelt.

Books
 Lewis, L. G. (2013). Edith Kermit Roosevelt: Creating the Modern First Lady. Lawrence, KS: University Press of Kansas.
 Morris, S. J. (2001). Edith Kermit Roosevelt: Portrait of a First Lady. New York: Modern Library.

Primary sources
 The papers of Theodore Roosevelt. The Library of Congress.
 The Theodore Roosevelt Collection. Harvard University.

Helen Herron Taft 
Helen Louise "Nellie" Taft, née Herron; June 2, 1861   May 22, 1943; She was the wife of William Howard Taft.

Books
 Anthony, C. S. (2007). Nellie Taft: The Unconventional First Lady of the Ragtime Era. New York: HarperCollins.
 Gould, L. L. (2010). Helen Taft: Our Musical First Lady. Lawrence, KS: University Press of Kansas.

Primary sources
 Taft, H. H. (2010). Recollections of Full Years. Charleston, SC: BiblioLife.
 Taft, W. H., & Gould, L. L. (2011). My dearest Nellie: The letters of William Howard Taft to Helen Herron Taft, 1909-1912. Lawrence, KS: University Press of Kansas.
 The papers of William Howard Taft. Library of Congress.

For information about Helen Herron Taft, see the Bibliography of William Howard Taft

Ellen Axson Wilson 
Ellen Louise Axson Wilson, née Axson; May 15, 1860   August 6, 1914; She was the first wife of Woodrow Wilson. She died in 1914 and was succeeded as First Lady (acting) by her daughter, Margaret.

Biographies of Woodrow Wilson with significant information about Ellen Axson Wilson
 Berg, A. S. (2013). Wilson. New York: Simon & Schuster.
 Bragdon, Henry W. (1967). Woodrow Wilson: the Academic Years. Cambridge, MA: Belknap Press.
 Cooper, John Milton Jr. (2009). Woodrow Wilson. New York: Knopf Doubleday
 Link, A. S. (1947–1965), Wilson (5 vols.). Princeton, NJ: Princeton University Press.
 Mulder, John H. (1978). Woodrow Wilson: The Years of Preparation. Princeton, NJ: Princeton University Press.

Primary sources
 The papers of Woodrow Wilson. Digital Collection, Library of Congress.
 The papers of Woodrow Wilson. The United States National Archives.
 The papers of Woodrow Wilson. Digital Collection, The University of Virginia.
 The papers of Woodrow Wilson. Printed Volumes, Princeton University Press.

Margaret Woodrow Wilson
Margaret Woodrow Wilson, née Wilson; April 16, 1886  February 12, 1944; She was the daughter of Woodrow Wilson and filled in for her mother Ellen as acting First Lady until her father remarried in 1915.

Relatively little has been written about Margaret Woodrow Wilson. For information about her, see the Bibliography of Woodrow Wilson.

Edith Wilson 
Edith Wilson, née Bolling; October 15, 1872  December 28, 1961; She was the second wife of Woodrow Wilson.

Biographies of Woodrow Wilson with significant information about Edith Wilson
 Berg, A. S. (2013). Wilson. New York: Simon & Schuster.
 Cooper, John Milton Jr. (2009). Woodrow Wilson. New York: Knopf Doubleday.
 Levin, P. L. (2001). Edith and Woodrow: The Wilson White House. New York: Scribner. 
 Link, A. S. (1947–1965), Wilson (5 vols.). Princeton, NJ: Princeton University Press.

Florence Harding 
Florence Mabel Harding, née Kling; August 15, 1860  November 21, 1924; She was the wife of Warren G. Harding.

Books
 Anthony, Carl Sferranza (1998). Florence Harding: The First Lady, The Jazz Age, and the Death of America's Most Scandalous President. New York: W. Morrow & Company.
 Sibley, Katherine A. S. (2009). First Lady Florence Harding: Behind the Tragedy and Controversy. Lawrence, KS: University Press of Kansas.

For information about Florence Harding, see the Bibliography of Warren G. Harding

Grace Coolidge 
Grace Anna Coolidge, née Goodhue; January 3, 1879  July 8, 1957; She was the wife of Calvin Coolidge.

Books
 Ferrell, R. H. (2008). Grace Coolidge: The people's lady in Silent Cal's White House. Lawrence, KS: University Press of Kansas.

For information about Grace Coolidge, see the Bibliography of Calvin Coolidge.

Lou Henry Hoover 
Lou Henry Hoover, née Henry; March 29, 1874  January 7, 1944; She was the wife of Herbert Hoover.

Books
 Allen, A. B. (2000). An Independent Woman: The Life of Lou Henry Hoover. Westport, CT. Greenwood Press
 Mayer, D. C. (1994). Lou Henry Hoover: Essays on a Busy Life. Worland, WY: High Plains Publishing.
 Walch, T. (2003). Uncommon Americans: The Lives and Legacies of Herbert and Lou Henry Hoover. Westport, CT: Praeger.
 Young, N. B. (2016). Lou Henry Hoover: Activist First Lady. Lawrence, KS: University Press of Kansas.

Journal articles
 Clements, K. (2004). The New Era and the New Woman. Pacific Historical Review, 73(3), pp. 425–462.
 Day, D. (1990). A New Perspective on the "DePriest Tea" Historiographic Controversy. The Journal of Negro History, 75(3/4), pp. 120–124.
 Jones, M. (2014). The Joy of Sympathetic Companionship: The Correspondence of Mary Vaux Walcott and Lou Henry Hoover. Quaker History, 103(1), pp. 36–52. 
 Mayer, D. (1990). An Uncommon Woman: The Quiet Leadership Style of Lou Henry Hoover. Presidential Studies Quarterly, 20(4), pp. 685–698. 
 Melville, J. (1988). The First Lady and the Cowgirl. Pacific Historical Review, 57(1), pp. 73–76.

Primary sources
 Lou Henry Hoover Papers. The Herbert Hoover Library.

Eleanor Roosevelt 
Anna Eleanor Roosevelt, née Roosevelt; (born October 11, 1884  died November 7, 1962); (in position March 4, 1933  April 12, 1945); She was the wife of Franklin Roosevelt. Because her husband was the longest serving President, Eleanor Roosevelt is the longest serving First Lady.

 See Bibliography of Eleanor Roosevelt for works about and by Eleanor Roosevelt.

Bess Truman 
Elizabeth Virginia Truman, née Wallace; (born February 13, 1885  died October 18, 1982); (in position April 12, 1945  January 20, 1953 ); She was the wife of Harry S. Truman.

Books
 Sale, S. L. (2010). Bess Wallace Truman: Harry's White House "boss". Lawrence, KS: University Press of Kansas.
 Truman, M. (2014). Bess Truman. Newbury CT: New Word City.

Primary sources
 Truman, H. S., & Ferrell, R. H. (1997). Off the Record: The Private Papers of Harry S. Truman. Columbia: University of Missouri Press.
 Truman, H. S., Truman, B. W., & Ferrell, R. H. (1998). Dear Bess: The Letters from Harry to Bess Truman, 1910-1959. Columbia: University of Missouri Press.
 The papers of Harry S. Truman. The Truman Library.

 Levantrosser, W. F. (1986). Harry S. Truman: The Man from Independence. New York: Greenwood Press.
 McCullough, D. (1992). Truman. New York: Simon & Schuster.
 Truman, H. S., & Ferrell, R. H. (2002). The Autobiography of Harry S. Truman. Columbia: University of Missouri Press.

Mamie Eisenhower 
Mamie Geneva Eisenhower, née Doud; (born November 14, 1896  died November 1, 1979); (in position January 20, 1953  January 20, 1961); She was the wife of Dwight Eisenhower. She was the last First Lady to be born in the nineteenth century.

Books
 Eisenhower, S. (1997). Mrs. Ike: Memories and reflections on the life of Mamie Eisenhower. Albany, NY: Ferrous Books.
 Holt, M. I. (2007). Mamie Doud Eisenhower: The General's First Lady. Lawrence, KS: University Press of Kansas.

Primary sources
 The papers of Dwight David Eisenhower. The United States National Archives.
 Eisenhower, D. D., Chandler, A. D., Galambos, L., Van, E. D. (2003). The Papers of Dwight David Eisenhower. Baltimore: Johns Hopkins University Press.

 Ambrose, S. E. (1983). Eisenhower. New York: Simon and Schuster.

Jacqueline Kennedy Onassis 
Jacqueline Lee Kennedy Onassis, née Bouvier; (born July 28, 1929  died May 19, 1994); (In position January 20, 1961  November 22, 1963); She was the wife of John F. Kennedy.

Books
 Adler, B. (2014). The Eloquent Jacqueline Kennedy Onassis: A portrait in her own words. New York: HarperCollins.
 Alam, M. B. (2007). Jackie Kennedy: Trailblazer. New York: Nova History Publications.
 Leaming, B. (2015). Jacqueline Bouvier Kennedy Onassis: The Untold Story. New York: Thomas Dunne Books.
 Perry, B. A. (2019). Jacqueline Kennedy: First Lady of the New Frontier. Lawrence, KS: University Press of Kansas.
 Pottker, J. (2002). Janet and Jackie: The Story of a Mother and Her Daughter. New York: St. Martin's Press.
 Spoto, D. (2000). Jacqueline Bouvier Kennedy Onassis: A Life. New York: St. Martin's Press.

Journal articles
 Walton, W. (2013). Jacqueline Kennedy, Frenchness, and French-American Relations in the 1950s and Early 1960s. French Politics, Culture & Society, 31(2), pp. 34–57.

Primary sources
 Ritchie, D., & Schlesinger, A. (2012). Jacqueline Kennedy: Historical Conversations On Her Life With John F. Kennedy The Oral History Review, 39(1), pp. 162–165.

 O'Brien, M. (2006). John F. Kennedy: A Biography. New York: St. Martin's Press.

Lady Bird Johnson 
Claudia Alta "Lady Bird" Johnson, née Taylor; (born December 22, 1912  died July 11, 2007); (in position November 22, 1963  January 20, 1969); She was the wife of Lyndon B. Johnson.

Books
 Gillette, M. L. (2015). Lady Bird Johnson: An oral history. New York: Oxford University Press.
 Gould, L. L. (1999). Lady Bird Johnson: Our Environmental First Lady. Lawrence, KS: University Press of Kansas.
 Johnson, C. A. (2012). Lady Bird Johnson. New York: Oxford University Press.
 Russell, J. J. (2014). Lady Bird: A Biography of Mrs. Johnson. New York: Simon and Schuster.

Journal articles
 Gould, L. (1986). First Lady as Catalyst: Lady Bird Johnson and Highway Beautification in the 1960s. Environmental Review, 10(2), pp. 77–92.
 Koman, R. (2001). "...To Leave This Splendor for Our Grandchildren": Lady Bird Johnson, Environmentalist Extraordinaire. OAH Magazine of History, 15(3), pp. 30–34. 
 Smith, N. (1990). Private Reflections on a Public Life: The Papers on Lady Bird Johnson at the LBJ Library. Presidential Studies Quarterly, 20(4), pp. 737–744.

Biographies of Lyndon Johnson with significant information about Lady Bird Johnson
 Caro, R. A. (1982/1990/2002/2012) The Years of Lyndon Johnson (4 vols.). New York: Knopf.
 Dallek, Robert (2005). Lyndon B. Johnson: Portrait of a President. New York: Oxford University Press.

Pat Nixon 
Thelma Catherine "Pat" Nixon, née Ryan; (born March 16, 1912  died June 22, 1993); (in position January 20, 1969  August 9, 1974); She was the wife of Richard Nixon.

Books
 Brennan, M. C. (2011). Pat Nixon: Embattled First Lady. Lawrence, KS: University Press of Kansas.
 Eisenhower, J. N. (1986). Pat Nixon: The Untold Story. New York: Simon & Schuster.
 David, L. (1978). The Lonely Lady of San Clemente: The Story of Pat Nixon. New York: Berkley Publishing. 
 Swift, W. (2014). Pat and Dick: The Nixons, An Intimate Portrait of a Marriage. New York: Simon & Schuster.

Biographies of Richard Nixon with significant information about Pat Nixon
 Farrell, J. A. (2017). Richard Nixon: The Life. New York: Doubleday.
 Thomas, E. (2016). Being Nixon: A Man Divided. New York: Random House.

Betty Ford 
Elizabeth Anne Ford, née Bloomer, formerly Warren; (born April 8, 1918  died July 8, 2011); (in position August 9, 1974  January 20, 1977); She was the wife of Gerald R. Ford.

Books
 McCubbin, L. (2019). Betty Ford: First Lady, Women's Advocate, Survivor, Trailblazer. New York :Gallery Books.
 Greene, J. R. (2019). Betty Ford: Candor and Courage in the White House. Lawrence, KS: University Press of Kansas.

Journal articles
 Borrelli, M. (2001). Competing Conceptions of the First Ladyship: Public Responses to Betty Ford's "60 Minutes" Interview. Presidential Studies Quarterly, 31(3), pp. 397–414.
 Tobin, L. (1990). Betty Ford as First Lady: A Woman for Women. Presidential Studies Quarterly, 20(4), pp. 761–767.

Biographies of Gerald Ford with significant information about Betty Ford
 Cannon, J., & Cannon, S. (2014). Gerald R. Ford: An Honorable Life. Ann Arbor: University of Michigan Press.

Rosalynn Carter 
Eleanor Rosalynn Carter, née Smith; (born August 18, 1927); (in position January 20, 1977  January 20, 1981); She is the wife of Jimmy Carter.

Books
 Godbold, E. S. (2010). Jimmy and Rosalynn Carter: The Georgia Years, 1924-1974. New York: Oxford University Press.
 Kaufman, S. (2007). Rosalynn Carter: Equal Partner in the White House. Lawrence, KS: University Press of Kansas.

Journal articles
 The American Bar Association. Human Rights Heroes: Jimmy and Rosalynn Carter. (2003). Human Rights, 30(1), pp. 24–24. 
 Jensen, F. (1990). An Awesome Responsibility: Rosalynn Carter as First Lady. Presidential Studies Quarterly, 20(4), pp. 769–775.
 Smith, K. (1997). The First Lady Represents America: Rosalynn Carter in South America. Presidential Studies Quarterly, 27(3), pp. 540–548.

Primary sources
 Carter, J. (2015). A Full Life: Reflections at Ninety. New York: Simon & Schuster.
 Carter, R. (1994). First Lady from Plains. Fayetteville: University of Arkansas Press.

Biographies of Jimmy Carter with significant information about Rosalynn Carter
 Balmer, R. (2014). Redeemer: The Life of Jimmy Carter. New York: Basic Books.
 Eizenstat, S., & Albright, M. K. (2020). President Carter: The White House Years. New York: St. Martin's Press.

Nancy Reagan 
Nancy Davis Reagan, née Robbins, later Davis (adoption); (born July 6, 1921  died March 6, 2016); (in position January 20, 1981  January 20, 1989); She was the wife of Ronald Reagan.

Books
 Benze, James G. (2005). Nancy Reagan: On the White House Stage. Lawrence, KS: University Press of Kansas.
 Deaver, M. K. (2004). Nancy: A Portrait of My Years with Nancy Reagan. New York: William Morrow.
 Leamer, L. (1983). Make-Believe: The Story of Nancy and Ronald Reagan. New York: HarperCollins.
 Loizeau, P. M. (2004). Nancy Reagan: The Woman Behind the Man. Hauppauge, NY: Nova Publishers.
 Loizeau, P. M. (2005). Nancy Reagan in Perspective. Hauppauge, NY: Nova Publishers.
 Schifando, P., & Joseph, J. (2007). Entertaining at the White House with Nancy Reagan. New York: William Morrow.
 Wertheimer, M. M. (2004). Nancy Reagan in Perspective. Lanham, MD: Rowman & Littlefield Publishers.

Journal articles
 Benez, J. (1990). Nancy Reagan: China Doll or Dragon Lady? Presidential Studies Quarterly, 20(4), pp. 777–790.
 Stimpson, C. (1988). Nancy Reagan Wears a Hat: Feminism and Its Cultural Consensus. Critical Inquiry, 14(2), pp. 223–243.

Primary sources
 Reagan, N., & Libby, B. (1980). Nancy: The Autobiography of America's First Lady. New York: HarperCollins.
 Reagan, N., & Novak, W. (1989). My Turn: The Memoirs of Nancy Reagan. New York: Random House. 
 Reagan, N., & Reagan, R. (2002). I Love You, Ronnie: The Letters of Ronald Reagan to Nancy Reagan. New York: Random House.

Biographies of Ronald Reagan with significant information about Nancy Reagan
 Cannon, Lou (2003). Governor Reagan: His Rise to Power. New York: Public Affairs.
 Cannon, L. (2008). President Reagan: The Role of a Lifetime. New York: PublicAffairs.

Barbara Bush 
Barbara Pierce Bush, née Pierce; (born June 8, 1925  died April 17, 2018); (in position January 20, 1989  January 20, 1993); She was the wife of George H. W. Bush. She is one of two individuals to be both a wife and mother of a President.

Books
 Gullan, H. I. (2001). Faith of our Mothers: The Stories of Presidential Mothers from Mary Washington to Barbara Bush. Grand Rapids: William B. Eerdmans.
 Kelley, K. (2005). The Family: The Real Story of the Bush Dynasty. New York: Anchor Books.
 Killian, P. (2003). Barbara Bush: Matriarch of a Dynasty. New York: St. Martin's Press.
 Myra, G. G. (2018). Barbara Bush: Presidential Matriarch. Lawrence, KS: University Press of Kansas.
 Page, S. (2019). The Matriarch: Barbara Bush and the Making of an American Dynasty. New York: Twelve.
 Radcliffe, D. (1990). Simply Barbara Bush: A Portrait of America's Candid First Lady. New York: Warner Books.

Journal articles
 Hertz, R., & Reverby, S. (1995). Gentility, Gender, and Political Protest: The Barbara Bush Controversy at Wellesley College. Gender and Society, 9(5), pp. 594–611.

Primary sources
 Bush, B. (1994). Barbara Bush: A Memoir. New York: Scribner.
 Bush, B. (2004). Reflections: Life After the White House. New York: Scribner.

Biographies of George H. W. Bush with significant information about Barbara Bush

Hillary Clinton 
Hillary Diane Rodham Clinton, née Rodham; October 26, 1947; She is the wife of Bill Clinton. After her time as First Lady, she became a United States Senator and later Secretary of State. She is the only First Lady to have held national office. She became the first woman to run for President on a major party ticket and the first First Lady to run for President in 2016.

 See Bibliography of Hillary Clinton

Laura Bush 
Laura Lane Welch Bush, née Welch; (born November 4, 1946); (in position January 20, 2001  January 20, 2009); She is the wife of George W. Bush.

Books
 Gerhart, A. (2014). The Perfect Wife: The life and choices of Laura Bush. New York: Simon & Schuster.
 Kelley, K. (2005). The Family: The Real Story of the Bush Dynasty. New York: Anchor Books.
 Kessler, R. (2006). Laura Bush: An Intimate Portrait of the First Lady. New York: Doubleday.

Journal articles
 Burns, L. (2005). Collective Memory and the Candidates' Wives in the 2004 Presidential Campaign. Rhetoric and Public Affairs, 8(4), pp. 684–688. 
 Kniffel, L. (2001). First Lady, First Librarian. American Libraries, 32(2), pp. 50–51.
 Kniffel, L. (2008). 8 Years Later: Laura Bush: Librarian in the White House. American Libraries, 39(11), 42-47. 
 MacManus, S., & Quecan, A. (2008). Spouses as Campaign Surrogates: Strategic Appearances by Presidential and Vice Presidential Candidates' Wives in the 2004 Election. Political Science and Politics, 41(2), pp. 337–348.
 Muller, P. (2002). Leveraging Laura Bush. American Libraries, 33(3), pp. 38–38.
 Nixie, K., & Gilles, M. (2009). Mixed Reviews on Laura Bush. American Libraries, 40(1/2), pp. 10–10.
 Sulfaro, V. (2007). Affective Evaluations of First Ladies: A Comparison of Hillary Clinton and Laura Bush. Presidential Studies Quarterly, 37(3), pp. 486–514.

Primary sources
 Bush, L. (2014). Spoken from the Heart. New York: Scribner.

 Smith, J. E. (2017). Bush. New York: Simon & Schuster.

Michelle Obama 
Michelle LaVaughn Robinson Obama, née Robinson; January 17, 1964; She is the wife of Barack Obama. She is the first and only African American First Lady.

Books

Journal articles

Primary sources

 Obama, M. (2018). Becoming. New York: Crown.

Melania Trump 
Melania Trump, née Knavs, born Melanija Knavs; April 26, 1970; She is the wife of Donald Trump. She is the second first lady, after Louisa Adams, born outside the United States.

Books

Journal articles

Primary sources
 

Jill Biden 
Jill Tracy Jacobs Biden, née Jacobs, born June 3, 1951; She is the second wife of Joe Biden; his first wife, Neilia Hunter Biden died in 1972 prior to his becoming President of the United States.

Books

Journal articles

Primary sources

Further reading
 Emerson, J. (2010). Mary Lincoln: An Annotated Bibliography. Journal of the Illinois State Historical Society, 103(2), pp. 180–235.
 Emerson, J. (2011). Mary Lincoln: An Annotated Bibliography Supplement. Journal of the Illinois State Historical Society, 104(3), pp. 238–249. 
 Mayo, E., & Black, A. (2001). For Further Reading: A Bibliography of Selected First Lady Resources. OAH Magazine of History, 15(3), pp. 5–8.

See also
 First Ladies National Historic Site
 First Lady of the United States
 List of first ladies of the United States

Notes

References

External links
 The Presidents. The Miller Center, University of Virginia
 The National First Ladies Library.
 First Ladies of the United States. Library of Congress.
 Office of the First Lady. WhiteHouse.gov
 First Lady's Gallery. WhiteHouse.gov
 The First Ladies at the Smithsonian. An online exhibition from the National Museum of American History; Smithsonian Institution

United States
Political bibliographies